Henrik Kirják (born 12 July 1999) is a Hungarian professional footballer who plays for III. Kerületi.

Career statistics
.

References

1999 births
People from Szolnok
Sportspeople from Jász-Nagykun-Szolnok County
Living people
Hungarian footballers
Association football defenders
Szolnoki MÁV FC footballers
Vasas SC players
Győri ETO FC players
Szombathelyi Haladás footballers
Budafoki LC footballers
Gyirmót FC Győr players
III. Kerületi TUE footballers
Nemzeti Bajnokság I players
Nemzeti Bajnokság II players
Nemzeti Bajnokság III players